Avery Avenue School, also known as Catawba Valley Legal Services, is a historic school building located at Morganton, Burke County, North Carolina.  It was built in 1923, and is a two-story, brick, crescent-shaped building. It has a polygonal center section features a pyramidal roof covered in mission tile and topped by a small belfry.  The building housed a school until 1957 when it was converted to offices for Burke County.

It was listed on the National Register of Historic Places in 1987.

References

School buildings on the National Register of Historic Places in North Carolina
School buildings completed in 1923
Buildings and structures in Burke County, North Carolina
National Register of Historic Places in Burke County, North Carolina
1923 establishments in North Carolina